John A. Spezzaferro (August 1, 1921 – February 5, 2002) was an American football player and coach. He served as the head football coach at Heidelberg University in Tiffin, Ohio from 1978 to 1980, compiling a record of 4–23. Spezzaferro had previously worked as an assistant football coach at the University of Dayton.

A veteran of World War II, Spezzaferro was noted for taking six bullets in the Pacific theater.

Head coaching record

College

References

1921 births
2002 deaths
Dayton Flyers football coaches
Heidelberg Student Princes football coaches
Heidelberg Student Princes football players
Pittsburgh Steelers coaches
High school football coaches in Ohio
United States Marine Corps personnel of World War II
Sportspeople from Cleveland
People from Somerset County, Pennsylvania
Players of American football from Cleveland